Geoffrey Charles Lawrence,  (1915–1994) was acting Chief Minister of Zanzibar from 23 February 1961 to 5 June 1961.

1915 births
1994 deaths
Chief Ministers of Zanzibar
Zanzibari politicians
Companions of the Order of St Michael and St George
Officers of the Order of the British Empire